1999 Assembly election can refer to:

India 
1999 Maharashtra Legislative Assembly election
1999 Andhra Pradesh Legislative Assembly election
1999 Karnataka Legislative Assembly election

Wales 
1999 National Assembly for Wales election

Venezuela 

 1999 Venezuelan Constituent Assembly election

See also 
List of elections in 1999